Ogilala is the second solo album by American musician Billy Corgan (under his full name, William Patrick Corgan), frontman of alternative rock band The Smashing Pumpkins. The album was released on October 13, 2017, in the United States. It marks Corgan's first solo album since his 2005 debut, TheFutureEmbrace. The album was co-produced by Corgan with Rick Rubin, and does not feature Corgan's longtime collaborator Bjorn Thorsrud. "Aeronaut" preceded the record as its lead single, with a US tour beginning the day after the record's release.

The album's songs are primarily acoustic and are predominantly performed on acoustic guitar, piano and strings, contrasting with much of Corgan's other work, as well as his debut solo album. The song "Processional" marks the first time since The Smashing Pumpkins' break-up in 2000 that Corgan has collaborated with the band's former guitarist James Iha.

Track listing 

Some tracks are cross-faded in the physical version, thus reducing the playing time of the album about 20 seconds.

Personnel 
 Billy Corgan (as William Patrick Corgan) – vocals, acoustic & electric guitars, piano, Mellotron, photography, production
 James Iha – guitar and Mellotron on "Processional"
 Sierra Swan – occasional backing vocals
 Rick Rubin – production

Charts

References 

2017 albums
Billy Corgan albums
Albums produced by Billy Corgan
Albums produced by Rick Rubin
Reprise Records albums
BMG Rights Management albums
Albums recorded at Shangri-La (recording studio)